Luis Contreras (born 5 February 1951) is a Venezuelan boxer. He competed in the men's light welterweight event at the 1972 Summer Olympics.

References

1951 births
Living people
Venezuelan male boxers
Olympic boxers of Venezuela
Boxers at the 1972 Summer Olympics
Place of birth missing (living people)
Light-welterweight boxers